Philipp Wendler (born 2 June 1991) is an Austrian footballer who plays for SV Lafnitz.

References

External links
 
 

Austrian footballers
Austrian Football Bundesliga players
Kapfenberger SV players
1991 births
Living people
Association football forwards